Wescoats Corner is an unincorporated community in Sussex County, Delaware, United States. Wescoats Corner is located at the intersection of U.S. Route 9 Business and Wescoats Corner Road, southwest of Lewes.

References

External links

Unincorporated communities in Sussex County, Delaware
Unincorporated communities in Delaware